Luigi Capotosti (February 23, 1863 – February 16, 1938) was an Italian Cardinal of the Roman Catholic Church who served as Apostolic Datary from 1933 until his death, and was elevated to the cardinalate in 1926.

Biography
Luigi Capotosti was born in Monte Giberto, and studied at the seminary in Fermo before being ordained to the priesthood in 1885. He then served as private secretary to the Archbishop of Fermo (Amilcare Malagola and then Roberto Papiri), professor at the Seminary of Fermo, official of the archdiocesan curia, and canon of the metropolitan cathedral chapter.

On April 8, 1906, Capotosti was appointed Bishop of Modigliana by Pope Pius X, receiving his episcopal consecration on the following May 31 from Archbishop Carlo Castelli, OSC. He was later named Secretary of the Sacred Congregation for the Discipline of the Sacraments on June 8, 1914. As Secretary, Capotosti served as the second-highest official of that dicastery, successively under Cardinals Filippo Giustini and Michele Lega. He was promoted to Titular Archbishop of Thermae Basilicae on January 22, 1915.

Pope Pius XI created him Cardinal Priest of San Pietro in Vincoli in the consistory of June 21, 1926. After serving as papal legate to the National Eucharistic Congress in Loreto on August 30, 1930, Capotosti was appointed Pro-Apostolic Datary on July 29, 1931, rising to become full Datary on September 23, 1933. He was papal legate to the Regional Eucharistic Congress in Piacenza on July 30, 1933, and Camerlengo of the Sacred College of Cardinals from April 1, 1935 to June 15, 1936.

The Cardinal died in Rome, at age 74. He was buried in the crypt of the Sacred Congregation of Propaganda Fide at the Campo Verano cemetery before his remains were relocated to the parish church of Moresco in Ascoli Piceno.

References

External links
Catholic-Hierarchy 
Cardinals of the Holy Roman Church

1863 births
1938 deaths
People from the Province of Fermo
20th-century Italian cardinals
20th-century Italian Roman Catholic bishops